Subrina Munroe (born 11 June 1985) is a Guyanese former cricketer who played as a right-arm medium bowler. She appeared in 23 One Day Internationals and 21 Twenty20 Internationals for the West Indies between 2010 and 2015. She played domestic cricket for  Guyana.

References

External links

1985 births
Living people
West Indian women cricketers
West Indies women One Day International cricketers
West Indies women Twenty20 International cricketers
Sportspeople from Georgetown, Guyana
Guyanese women cricketers